Taltos may refer to:

 Táltos, in Hungarian tradition a human being similar to a shaman, or alternately the horse of such a person, called the Táltos Horse
 Taltos (Brust novel), a 1988 novel by Steven Brust
 Taltos (Rice novel), a 1994 novel by Anne Rice